Roger Thomas Duffy (born July 16, 1967) is a former center  and guard who played twelve seasons in the National Football League.

1967 births
Living people
American football centers
American football offensive guards
Players of American football from Pittsburgh
Penn State Nittany Lions football players
New York Jets players
Pittsburgh Steelers players